Harold David Ock (March 17, 1912 in Brooklyn, New York – March 18, 1975 in Mt. Kisco, New York), was a professional baseball player who played catcher in one game for the 1935 Brooklyn Dodgers. He attended Lehigh University.

External links

1912 births
1975 deaths
Lehigh Mountain Hawks baseball players
Major League Baseball catchers
Baseball players from New York (state)
Brooklyn Dodgers players
Burials at the Cemetery of the Evergreens